The Jewish Reconstructionist Federation (JRF), founded in 1955, was the synagogue arm of Reconstructionist Judaism, serving more than 100 congregations and havurot spread across North America. In June 2012, the Reconstructionist movement underwent a restructuring that merged JRF with the Reconstructionist Rabbinical College to form a new national organization initially named RRC and Jewish Reconstructionist Communities. The merged organization was initially headed by Rabbi Dan Ehrenkrantz, a 1989 graduate of the College, and currently by Rabbi Deborah Waxman who took over in 2014. In January 2018, the merged organization changed its name to Reconstructing Judaism.

References

External links
new site of the Jewish Reconstructionist Movement
archived site of the Jewish Reconstructionist Federation
Reconstructionist Rabbinical College
Reconstructionist Press
Reconstructionist Summer Programs
Evolve: Groundbreaking Jewish Conversations
Guide to the Records of the Jewish Reconstructionist Foundation at the American Jewish Historical Society, New York, NY
 

 
World Union for Progressive Judaism